Vinduyih (Middle Persian: Windōē) or Bendoy was a Sasanian nobleman from the Ispahbudhan family. His sister was the mother of Khosrau II, thus making Vinduyih the uncle of Khosrau. Vinduyih and Vistahm played an important role in restoring the throne for Khosrau II from Bahram Chobin. He was later deposed in Ctesiphon by the orders of Khosrau II.

Family tree

References

6th-century Iranian people
Assassinated royalty
Generals of Khosrow II
House of Ispahbudhan
People executed by the Sasanian Empire
Viziers of the Sasanian Empire
Generals of Hormizd IV